Khoshya is a gotra of Ahirs of Haryana. According to historian Richard Gabriel Fox, Khoshya was dominant clan in Ahirwal whose ancestors occupied by force some Gujjar villages in Bharawas. One of the descendants of this clan, Chowdhari Deepchand was a sardar in the army of Emperor Alamgir II (1754–59).

It is considered a Gotra in Haryana, but on a different note, it is also found as a surname in the Brahmin community of Kashmir, known as the Kashmiri Pandits

References

See also
 Yaduvanshi Ahirs
 Haryana

Clans
Ahir